AnimEigo is an American entertainment company that licenses and distributes anime, samurai films and Japanese cinema. Founded in 1988 by Robert Woodhead and Roe R. Adams III, the company was one of the first in North America dedicated to licensing anime and helped give anime a noticeable following in the region. Over its history, the company has released many anime titles, such as Urusei Yatsura, You're Under Arrest, Vampire Princess Miyu, Otaku no Video, the original Bubblegum Crisis OVA series, and Kimagure Orange Road.

Their name is a portmanteau of "anime" and "eigo" (英語), the Japanese word for the English language.

History
The company was founded in 1988 in Ithaca, New York by Robert Woodhead and Roe R. Adams III. It is now based in Wilmington, North Carolina and run by Natsumi Ueki, Woodhead's wife. Their first release was Metal Skin Panic Madox 01. In July 2003, the company signed a deal with Koch Entertainment to help market and distribute their titles in the United States and Canada.

Between 2010 and 2013 the company lost a lot of its titles. For example, in February 2010, they announced they lost the rights to the Oh My Goddess! OVAs. In April 2010, the company announced they were unable to license the remaining episodes of Yawara!. They later lost the rights to the episodes they had previously licensed. In February 2011, the company announced they had lost the rights to Urusei Yatsura, one of their more popular titles. The company also lost the rights to the You're Under Arrest and Battle Royal High School anime series, as well as the Zatoichi, Lone Wolf and Cub, and Portrait of Hell live action movies.

In October 2013, AnimEigo launched their first Kickstarter campaign to crowdfund a new release, specifically to re-release Bubblegum Crisis as a limited edition Blu-ray. The Kickstarter was successfully funded in October 2013, and the Blu-ray was subsequently released in December 2014. They also successfully kickstarted re-releases of Otaku no Video, Riding Bean, A.D. Police Files, Gunsmith Cats, and Megazone 23.

Distribution
The company streams their titles on VRV (via VRV Select), Hoopla, RetroCrush, Tubi, and CONtv. Some of their titles were on Hulu, but they have been removed.

The company is well known for the quality of its translation and subtitles, and pioneered such techniques as multi-color subtitles, overlapping dialogue, and supertitles that explain important cultural, linguistic and historical tidbits. They also include comprehensive cultural and linguistic liner notes with their releases.  Alert viewers will often find subtle references to pop culture and current events hidden in the subtitles when they match what the characters are actually saying.  Sometimes the references are blatant; in episode 18 of Super Dimension Fortress Macross, the dying Roy Fokker not only repeats the famous words of Mr. Spock from Star Trek II: The Wrath of Khan – "The needs of the many outweigh the needs of the few..." but adds Captain Kirk's reply – "or the one".

They also licensed two Lupin III films: Lupin III: The Fuma Conspiracy and Lupin III: Legend of the Gold of Babylon. Because of legal issues surrounding the Lupin name (which was used by author Monkey Punch without permission from the estate of Maurice Leblanc), the titles were released as Rupan III (which is the romaji pronunciation of Lupin). Even after the Lupin name passed into public domain in the 1990s, they continued to distribute the films as Rupan III.

Productions
Releases are only listed if the subtitling, dubbing, or other (localization) production work was handled by AnimEigo; rather than being licensed or redistributed from prior versions.

In print

Out of print

References

External links
 Official website
 

1988 establishments in North Carolina
Anime companies
Companies based in Wilmington, North Carolina
Entertainment companies established in 1988
Home video companies of the United States
Video production companies